"Mr. Denton on Doomsday" is episode three of the American television anthology series The Twilight Zone. It originally aired on October 16, 1959, on CBS. It was the first Twilight Zone episode to be rerun.

Opening narration

Plot
Al Denton was once known as the quickest draw in town, but riddled with increasing guilt over the losers in his gun duels (one of whom was a teenage boy), he became an alcoholic wreck and the laughingstock of the community. A mysterious salesman named Henry J. Fate causes Denton to inexplicably regain his expert shooting touch and once again inspire the respect and awe of the townsfolk; Denton explains to Liz, a saloon girl, that this will only cause reputation-hungry gunslingers from miles around to seek him out and, inevitably, kill him. He cleans himself up and goes sober but only, he says, so as to die with dignity. Just as Denton predicted, soon enough a challenge is delivered which Denton dares not refuse.

The still-weary and not-so-sure-handed Denton practices in the desert for his suicidal duel, but he misses his targets miserably and concludes that he must skip town. As he packs his things and tries to flee under the cover of night, he strikes up a conversation with Fate, who seems to know things about Denton and offers him a way out. Fate offers him a potion guaranteed to make the drinker the fastest gun in the West for exactly ten seconds. Denton is skeptical but Fate goads him into drinking a free sample, after which Denton immediately realizes its benefits.

At the appointed time, Denton faces his challenger, Pete Grant, a brash young gunfighter. Denton downs his potion only to find his opponent holding an identical empty bottle. Grant and Denton both realize that Fate tricked them, but it is too late to back out of the duel. Each man shoots the other in the hand, causing injuries which are minor but forever ruin both men's ability to pull a trigger.

Denton tells his young opponent that they have both been blessed because they will never again be able to fire a gun in anger. He tells Liz that Grant is lucky because he was given this lesson early. Henry J. Fate tips his hat to Denton and rides quietly out of town.

Closing narration

Preview for next week's story

Episode notes
This episode is one of very few in the series whose opening sequence features an eye with heavy mascara. It was plastered over the original opening when "Mr. Denton on Doomsday" was rerun on June 24, 1960. Although the plastering of Season One intros (including the majority of episodes with this alternate intro) is not uncommon due to the Summer 1961 repeat season, this is the only case of the alternate Season One intro plastering the original. The original lagoon opening has since been restored.

In his 1959 promotional film shown to potential sponsors, Rod Serling summarized an earlier version of this episode's plot under its original title, "Death, Destry, and Mr. Dingle". As told by Serling, the basic premise is similar, but the earlier version seems to have been more comedic in tone, involving a meek schoolteacher who quite unintentionally gains notoriety as a top gunslinger. The name "Mr. Dingle" (originally intended for the Dan Duryea character) would be used by Serling for a future episode, with Burgess Meredith playing the eponymous character in "Mr. Dingle, the Strong" in 1961. The harmonica in the background is playing the Russian folksong "Stenka Razin" (the melody of which was later adapted for the 1965 hit "The Carnival Is Over" by The Seekers).

Al Denton's speech to Liz Smith, in which he describes having been a top gunfighter until he turned to drink after being "called out" by a 16-year-old boy, was parodied in the Mel Brooks comedy Blazing Saddles. In that film, the Waco Kid (Gene Wilder) had also been a top gunfighter until he was challenged (and shot) by a six-year-old child, leading him to become an alcoholic.

Martin Landau, playing here the sadistic bully to the story's protagonist, Al Denton, would return to The Twilight Zone five years later in “The Jeopardy Room”; this time he is the sadistically-treated victim - a KGB major longing to defect but targeted for assassination.

Further reading 
 Sander, Gordon F.: Serling: The Rise And Twilight of Television's Last Angry Man. New York: Penguin Books, 1992.
 Zicree, Marc Scott: The Twilight Zone Companion. Sillman-James Press, 1982 (second edition)
DeVoe, Bill. (2008). Trivia from The Twilight Zone. Albany, GA: Bear Manor Media. 
Grams, Martin. (2008). The Twilight Zone: Unlocking the Door to a Television Classic. Churchville, MD: OTR Publishing. 
Now defunct Fair Lawn, New Jersey Mathcore band The Number 12 Looks Like You have a quote from this episode on the track titled "Document: Grace Budd" off of their debut album Put On Your Rosy Red Glasses (2003). The band took their name from a Twilight Zone episode, "Number 12 Looks Just Like You".

References

External links 
 

The Twilight Zone (1959 TV series season 1) episodes
1959 American television episodes
Television episodes written by Rod Serling